Mount Qasioun (transliterated as Jabal Qāsiyūn) is a mountain overlooking the city of Damascus, Syria. It has a range of restaurants, from which the whole city can be viewed. As the city has expanded over the years, some districts have been established on the foot of the mountain.

The mountain has been heavily entrenched with Syrian government forces since the start of the Syrian Civil War, as it is a strategic site in the battle for the outskirts of Damascus.

The Syrian government has not given the species any protected status. It's only benefiting factor was that part of the habitat of the species lies within a military area near the 'Qassioun Republican Guards Military Base' and other military facilities, which prevents civilians from accessing the area. The base and steepness of the habitat also prevent construction or development, but it is still classified as Critically endangered.

Etymology
The term Qasioun might mean "hard and dry" in Syriac language, which is the characteristic of the bare rocky mountain that has no grass, greenery, or water.

Religious significance

On the slopes of Jabal Qasiun is a cave steeped in legend. It is said to have been inhabited at one point by the first human being, Adam; and there are various stories told about Ibrāhīm (Abraham), and 'Īsā (Jesus) also having prayed in it. It is mentioned however in Medieval Arab history books as having been the place where Qābīl (Cain) killed Hābīl (Abel). It was known for hundreds of years as a place where prayers were immediately accepted, and especially in times of drought rulers of Damascus would climb to the cave and pray for rain. Because of the murder that took place there, claimed to be the first committed, it is called Maghārat al-Dam (the Cave of Blood). According to Sunni Muslims, Mount Qasioun is the site of the miḥrābs (prayer niches) of the 40 arch-saints, known as the Abdāl, who is said to pray the night vigil prayers every night. A small mosque has been built over the Cave of Blood containing these miḥrābs.

Further down the mountain from the 'Cave of Blood', there was another cave known as Maghārat al-Jūˁ (the Cave of Hunger). Stories about this cave are somewhat confusing. Some say that forty saints died there of hunger; al-Harawī, however, who lived in the 13th century, writes that it is said that forty prophets died there of hunger. At present, the cave has been concealed by surrounding houses, but that spot is called al-Juyūˁīyah (Roughly 'the Place of the Hungry').

On another flank of the same mountain is yet another cave, which has come down in local legend as being the cave of the Seven Sleepers, mentioned in early Christian sources, as well as in the Quran, where they are known as the Aṣḥāb al-Kahf (Companions of the Cave). This is rather dubious, however, and it is only one of many caves in this part of the world that share the claim. A madrassah has been built over the cave, but pilgrims are still granted access.

References

Mountains of Syria
Geography of Damascus